This is a list of hospitals in Jordan. (sorted by hospital name)

Hospitals

Abdali Hospital - Amman
Abdulhadi Eye Hospital - Amman
Ash-Shaami Hospital- Amman
Abu Obaida Hospital - Irbid
Akilah Hospital - Amman
Al Ahli Hospital - Amman
Al Bayader Hospital - Amman
Al Dhalil Hospital - Zarqa
Al Hanan General Hospital - Amman
Al Hayat General Hospital - Amman
Al Khalidi Medical Center - Amman
Al Maqased Hospital - Amman
Al Nadeem Hospital - Madaba
Al Quds Hospital - Amman
Al Safa Specialized Hospital - Jerash
Al Shaheed Abu Diah Hospital - Amman
Al-Amal Hospital - Amman
Al-Aqsa Hospital - Amman
Albashir Hospital - Amman
Al-Essra Hospital - Amman
Al-Hikma Modern Hospital - Zarqa
King Hussein Cancer Center - Amman
King Hussein Medical Center - Amman
Al-Iman Hospital - Ajloun
Al-Jazeera Hospital - Amman
Al-Karak Hospital - Karak
Al-Karama Hospital for Psychological Rehabilitation - Amman
Al-Kindi Hospital - Amman
Al-Mafraq Hospital - Mafraq
Al-Mahaba Hospital - Madaba
Almowasah Hospital - Amman
Al-Najah Hospital - Irbid
Al-Nour Sanitarium  - Mafraq
Al-Qawasmi Hospital - Irbid
Al-Ramtha Hospital - Irbid
Al-Rashid Hospital Center - Balqa
Al-Razi New Hospital - Zarqa
Al-Ruweished Hospital - Mafraq
Al-Salam Hospital - Karak
Al-Yarmouk Hospital - Irbid
Amman Surgical Hospital - Amman
Aqaba Modern Hospital - Aqaba
Arab Medical Center - Amman
The Arab Potash Co. Hospital - Karak
Dr. Ahmed Hamayda General Hospital - Amman
Dr. Jameel Al-Toutanji Hospital - Amman
Eye Speciality Hospital - Amman
Farah Center for Rehabilitation - Amman
The Farah Hospital - Amman
Ghor Al-Safi Hospital - Karak
Heba Hospital - Amman
Ibn-Alhaytham Hospital - Amman
Ibn-Alnafees Hospital - Irbid
The International Hospital - Amman
Irbid Islamic Hospital - Irbid
Irbid Speciality Hospital - Irbid
The Islamic Hospital - Amman
The Islamic Hospital - Aqaba
Istiklal Hospital - Amman
Istishari Hospital - Amman
The Italian Hospital - Amman
The Italian Hospital - Karak
Jabal Al Zaytoon Hospital - Zarqa
Jabal Amman Hospital - Amman
Jerash Hospital - Jerash
Jordan Hospital - Amman
Jordan Red Crescent Hospital - Amman
Jordan University Hospital - Amman
King Abdullah University Hospital - Irbid
King Hussein Cancer Center - Amman
Luzmila Hospital - Amman
Ma'an Hospital - Ma'an
Malhas Hospital - Amman
Marka Islamic Speciality Hospital - Amman
Maternity and Children Hospital - Mafraq
Milad Hospital - Amman
Muaath Bin Jabal Hospital - Irbid
National Center for Rehabilitation of Addicts - Amman
The National Centre for Diabetes, Endocrinology & Genetics - Amman
The National Centre for Mental Health - Balqa
Palestine Hospital - Amman
Philadelphia Hospital - Amman
Prince Ali Bin Al-Hussein Military Hospital - Karak
Prince Faisal Ben Al-Hussein Hospital - Zarqa
Prince Hamzah Hospital - Amman
Prince Hashem Bin Al-Hussein Military Hospital - Aqaba
Prince Hussein Ben Abdulla II Center of Urology and Organ Transplant - Amman
Prince Rashid Bin Al-Hassan Hospital - Amman
Prince Zaid Bin Al-Hussein Hospital - Tafilah
Princess Badeea Hospital - Irbid
Princess Basma Hospital - Irbid
Princess Haya Bint Al-Hussein Military Hospital - Ajloun
Princess Iman Hospital - Balqa
Princess Rahma Hospital - Irbid
Princess Raya Hospital - Irbid
Princess Salma Hospital - Madaba
Qasr Shabeeb Hospital - Zarqa
Queen Alia Heart Institute - Amman
Queen Alia Military Hospital - Amman
Queen Rania Hospital - Ma'an
Queen Rania Pediatric Hospital - Amman
Rahbat Al-Wardieh Hospital - Irbid
Roman Catholic Hospital - Irbid
Royal Jordanian Rehabilitation Center - Amman
Shmaisani Hospital - Amman
South Shona Hospital - Balqa
Speciality Hospital - Amman
Tla' Al-Ali Hospital - Amman
Zarqa Hospital - Zarqa
Zarqa National Hospital - Zarqa

References

 List
Jordan
Hospitals
Jordan